Begonia quinquealata is an endemic species of Begonia discovered in Salakot Falls, Napsan, Puerto Princesa City, in northern Palawan, Philippines. This species, along with B. suborbiculata Merr., are the only two known species in the Philippines with 5-winged capsules. Unlike any other member of Begonia sect. Baryandra, B. quinquealata is very distinctive for being a densely hairy herb with long creeping rhizomes. It differs also from B. suborbiculata in that it has thickly chartaceous, widely ovate leaves that have uniformly green upper leaf surface, densely velutinous, with denticulate leaf margin, outer tepals, and red scabrous ovary and capsules.

Etymology
The specific epithet refers to its 5-winged capsule.

References

External links
Chloroplast and nuclear DNA exchanges among Begonia sect. Baryandra species(Begoniaceae) from Palawan Island,Philippines, and descriptions of five new species
Begoniaceae

quinquealata
Endemic flora of the Philippines